The Argonauta-class submarine was the first sub-class of the 600 Series of coastal submarines built for the  (Royal Italian Navy) during the 1930s. Some of these boats played a minor role in the Spanish Civil War of 1936–1939 supporting the Spanish Nationalists. Of the seven boats built in this class, only a single one survived the Second World War.

Design and description
The Argonauta class was derived from the earlier s. They displaced  surfaced and  submerged. Their crew numbered 44 officers and enlisted men.

For surface running, the boats were powered by two  diesel engines, each driving one propeller shaft. When submerged each propeller was driven by a  electric motor. They could reach  on the surface and  underwater.

The boats were armed with six  torpedo tubes, four in the bow and two in the stern for which they carried a total of 12 torpedoes. They were also armed with a single  deck gun forward of the conning tower for combat on the surface. Their anti-aircraft armament consisted of two single  machine guns.

Ships
uboat.net Argonauta (AU) Argonauta Accessed 30 April 2022uboat.net IT Jalea Accessed 30 April 2022uboat.net Medusa (MU) Medusa Accessed 30 April 2022uboat.net Serpente (ex-Nautilus) (SE) Serpente Accessed 30 April 2022

Service
The seven Argonauta-class submarines saw action during the Second World War. Five were sunk in action during the conflict and a sixth was scuttled at the Italian armistice in 1943. The last surviving boat of the class was stricken in 1948.

Notes

References

External links
 Sommergibili Marina Militare website

  

 
Italian 600 Series submarines
Submarines of the Regia Marina